Hevela (also Romanized as Hevelā; also known as Hevelā-ye Bālā and Hevelā-ye Pā’īn) is a village in Miandorud-e Kuchak Rural District, in the Central District of Sari County, Mazandaran Province, Iran. At the 2006 census, its population was 2,384, in 597 families.

References 

Populated places in Sari County